Keshavapur is a village in Rangareddy district in Telangana, India. It falls under Shamirpet mandal. Which is located at 10 km from Keesara mandal and 30 km from Hyderabad.

References

Villages in Ranga Reddy district